Milan Ferenčík (born 2 February 1995) is a Slovak football player who currently plays for ŠK Tvrdošín as a midfielder.

Career

MFK Ružomberok
He made his Fortuna Liga debut for Ružomberok against Slovan Bratislava on 26 April 2014, entering in as a substitute in place of Andrej Lovas in the 71st minute of the match.

References

External links
 
 Futbalnet profile
 MFK Ružomberok profile
 Eurofotbal profile

1995 births
Living people
Slovak footballers
Association football midfielders
MFK Ružomberok players
MFK Tatran Liptovský Mikuláš players
MFK Dolný Kubín players
Slovak Super Liga players
2. Liga (Slovakia) players
5. Liga players
4. Liga (Slovakia) players